Denis Yuriiovych Bayev (born November 3, 1983) is a Ukrainian professional ice hockey defenceman who currently plays for Traktor Chelyabinsk of the Kontinental Hockey League (KHL).

Personal
Bayev was born in Konotop, Sumy Oblast, in Ukraine, where his father, Yuri Korneyevich, served in the military. His mother, Tamara, is a teacher of Russian language and Russian literature. His wife is Christina Bayev.

References

External links

 

1983 births
Living people
Traktor Chelyabinsk players
Ukrainian ice hockey defencemen
People from Konotop
Sportspeople from Sumy Oblast